

X-2 pilots

X-2 flights

See also
 Bell X-2
 Jean "Skip" Ziegler
 Frank Kendall Everest, Jr.
 Milburn Apt
 Iven Kincheloe

Flight lists